Goran Simić may refer to:

Goran Simić (poet), Bosnian poet
Goran Simić (singer) (1953–2008), Serbian bass